Kloser is a surname. Notable people with the surname include:

Harald Kloser (born 1956), Austrian-born film composer, writer, and producer
Heidi Kloser (born 1992), American freestyle skier
Mike Kloser (born 1959), American mountain biker

See also
Kloner
Klose